Sayed El-Nahas (19 November 1939 – 29 November 1994) was an Egyptian boxer. He competed at the 1960 Summer Olympics, 1964 Summer Olympics and the 1968 Summer Olympics. At the 1960 Summer Olympics, he defeated Mohamed Rizgalla and Jaggie van Staden, before losing to Quincey Daniels.

References

1939 births
1994 deaths
Egyptian male boxers
Olympic boxers of Egypt
Boxers at the 1960 Summer Olympics
Boxers at the 1964 Summer Olympics
Boxers at the 1968 Summer Olympics
African Games gold medalists for Egypt
African Games medalists in boxing
Sportspeople from Giza
Boxers at the 1965 All-Africa Games
Mediterranean Games medalists in boxing
Light-middleweight boxers
Mediterranean Games gold medalists for Egypt
Competitors at the 1959 Mediterranean Games
Competitors at the 1963 Mediterranean Games
20th-century Egyptian people